The 2022 season for the  road cycling team is its 26th season overall and the third consecutive year as a UCI WorldTeam. They use De Rosa bicycles, Campagnolo drivetrain, Corima wheels and Nalini clothing.

Team roster 

Riders who joined the team for the 2022 season

Riders who left the team during or after the 2021 season

Season victories

National, Continental, and World Champions

Notes

References

External links 

 

Cofidis men
2022 men
Cofidis men